The Spoornet Class  of 1992 is a South African electro-diesel locomotive.

Between 1992 and 1994, Spoornet placed fifty Class  dual mode locomotives in service. They are still the only dual powered electro-diesel locomotives in use by Transnet Freight Rail, capable of running either on  electricity off the catenary or on diesel fuel alone.

Manufacturer
The 3 kV DC Class  electro-diesel locomotive was designed for Spoornet by Consortium under the leadership of Siemens and was built by Union Carriage & Wagon (UCW) in Nigel, Transvaal.

Fifty locomotives entered service between 1992 and 1994, numbered in the range from 38-001 to 38-050. UCW did not allocate builder’s or works numbers to the locomotives it built for Spoornet, but used the Spoornet unit numbers for their record keeping.

Characteristics
The locomotive has two-station controls. For operation in the diesel-only mode it was powered by a  Caterpillar type DITA 3508 prime mover. Its diesel-only ability allows it to pick up and shunt wagons from unelectrified industrial sidings.

Service
The Class  was designed as a multi-purpose locomotive to replace steam on pickup work on the Witwatersrand, but it was also capable of long distance mainline work. Most of the locomotives were initially allocated to Gauteng depots at Germiston, Pyramid South and Krugersdorp with a lone locomotive serving at Bloemfontein in the Free State. Given that they were originally designed for shunting and hauler work, these locomotives have performed extremely well in multiple roles.

Shortly after entering service they were used to haul the "Witblitz" shipping container express train all the way between Johannesburg and Cape Town. This saved time by avoiding the need to change locomotives at Beaufort West and Kimberley to negotiate the  section between these two centres, since it could be traversed in diesel-only mode even though the units are less powerful in that mode.

The "Witblitz" express trains have long been discontinued, but some of the  speed limit boards were still in existence between Potchefstroom and Worcester as late as 2005.

For a number of years, the Class  also became the prime motive power on trains 5558 and 5559, the PX speed-freight overnight container trains between Durban Goods and Johannesburg's City Deep. It was found that the Class 10E electric locomotives previously used on this duty could not achieve the  speeds at which these fifty-wagon trains were booked. These trains were the Natal Corridor (NATCOR) equivalent of the "Witblits" trains.

In 1998, forty of these locomotives, numbers 38-011 to 38-050, and a number of electric locomotives were sold to Maquarie-GETX (General Electric Finance) and leased back to Spoornet for a ten-year period which expired in 2008.

By 2012, Class  locomotives still often ran with full loads on the mainlines between Broodsnyersplaas and Welgedacht and to the Sentrarand classification yards in Gauteng.

Dates in service
The Class 's years of construction as shown on their builder's plates and dates in service where known are listed in the table.

Class E38 locomotives
During the production  of the Class  for Spoornet, UCW also built three Class E38 electric locomotives for Amcoal Mines for use at the Landau Colliery near Witbank, Mpumalanga. The Class E38 electric locomotive is identical in appearance and dimensions to the Class , but was designed for 3 kV DC electric operation only.

Liveries
The Class 38-000 was delivered in the Spoornet orange livery with a yellow and blue chevron pattern on the cowcatchers. In the late 1990s at least one, no. 38-041, was repainted in the Spoornet blue livery with outline numbers on the long hood sides. After 2008 in the Transnet Freight Rail (TFR) era, several received the TFR red, green and yellow livery.

Illustration

References

External links

Bo-Bo locomotives
Cape gauge railway locomotives
3500
Railway locomotives introduced in 1992
Union Carriage & Wagon locomotives
1992 in South Africa